Mission San Xavier del Bac is a historic Spanish Catholic mission located about  south of downtown Tucson, Arizona, on the Tohono O'odham Nation San Xavier Indian Reservation. The mission was founded in 1692 by Padre Eusebio Kino in the center of a centuries-old settlement of the Sobaipuri O'odham, a branch of the Akimel or River O'odham located along the banks of the Santa Cruz River. The mission was named for Francis Xavier, a Christian missionary and co-founder of the Society of Jesus (Jesuit Order) in Europe. The original church was built to the north of the present Franciscan church. This northern church or churches served the mission until it was razed during an Apache raid in 1770.

The mission that survives today was built between 1783 and 1797, which makes it the oldest European structure in Arizona. Labor was provided by the O'odham. An outstanding example of Spanish Colonial architecture in the United States, the Mission San Xavier del Bac hosts some 200,000 visitors each year. It is a well-known pilgrimage site, with thousands visiting each year on foot and on horseback, some among ceremonial cavalcades or cabalgatas.

The site is also known in  the O'odham language as "goes in" or "comes in", meaning "where the water goes in", as the water in the Santa Cruz River came up to the surface a few miles south of Martinez Hill and then submerged again near Los Reales Wash. The Santa Cruz River that used to run year-round in this section was once critical to the community's survival, but now runs only part of the year.

History

Mission San Xavier del Bac was established in 1692 by Father Eusebio Francisco Kino, who founded a chain of Spanish missions in the Sonoran Desert. A Jesuit of Italian descent, Kino often visited and preached in the area, then the Pimería Alta colonial territory of the Viceroyalty of New Spain.

On the twenty-eighth we began the foundations of a very large and capacious church and house of San Xavier del Bac, all of the many people working with much pleasure and zeal, some in digging for the foundations, others in hauling many and very good stones of tezontle from a little hill which was about a quarter of a league away. ... On the twenty-ninth we continued laying the foundations of the church and of the house.

The "little hill" is believed to be that southeast of San Xavier del Bac. Charles III of Spain distrusted Jesuits and in 1767 banned them from Spanish lands in the Americas. He installed what he considered the more pliable and "reliable" Franciscans as replacements. The original church proved vulnerable to Apache attacks, which finally destroyed it in about 1770.

The present mission building was constructed under the direction of Franciscan fathers Juan Bautista Velderrain and Juan Bautista Llorenz between 1783 and 1797. With 7,000 pesos borrowed from a Sonoran rancher, they hired architect Ignacio Gaona, who employed a large workforce of O'odham to create today's church.

Following Mexican independence in 1821, what was then known as Alta California was administered from Mexico City. In 1822, the mission was included under the jurisdiction of the Catholic Diocese of Sonora. In 1828, the Mexican government banned all Spanish-born priests, with the last resident Franciscan departing San Xavier for Spain in 1837.

Left vacant, the mission began to decay. Concerned about their church, local Indians began to preserve what they could. With the Gadsden Purchase in 1853, the site of San Xavier became a part of the United States and the new Territory of Arizona. The church was re-opened in 1859 when the Santa Fe Diocese added the mission to its jurisdiction. It ordered repairs paid for with diocesan money, and assigned a priest to serve the community. In 1868 the Diocese of Tucson was established. It provided for regular services to be held again at the church.

The Tohono O’odham (called Papago Indians by settlers) were defending the property in 1867.  They resisted the suggestion of Brevet Brigadier General James F. Rusling to remove the bells from the building.  The General was on a tour of inspection for the Quartermaster's Dept. and described the building condition July 20 "Havier del Bac, some 10 miles south of Tucson, on the road to Tubac, a relic of the old Spanish rule in Arizona.  The church seems to have been built about 100 years ago, of large, red brick, rough coated with cement, and is still in a good state of preservation.  Inside it is handsomely frescoed, and was no doubt once rich in paintings, ornaments, &c., though these now have mostly disappeared.  It is cruciform in style, and the front, towers, &c., have originally been profusely decorated with saints, animals, &c., in niche or bas-relief.  It was no doubt a link in the chain of Spanish missions that the Jesuits, a century ago, established from the city of Mexico to northern California, and was abandoned with the subsequent collapse of their priestly power.  A village of Papago Indians now crouches at its feet, who regard the structure with a reverence, and will not allow the fine chime of bells still there to be removed.  Altogether this church is the best and oldest civilized structure to be found in Arizona.  Very slight repairs would make it fit for occupancy and worship again; but there are no inhabitants..." see "Affairs in Utah and the Territories" pp. 8–9  40th Congress 2nd Sesson Misc Doc. #153 Letters from Secretary of War 30 JUN 1867

In 1872, the Sisters of St. Joseph of Carondelet opened a school at the mission for the Tohono O'odham children. In 1895, a grant of $1,000 was given to repair the building. More classrooms were added in 1900. The Franciscans returned to the mission in 1913. In 1947, they built a new school next to the church for the local children.

Renovation

Extensive restoration that began in 1992 and was continuing as of 2021 has returned the mission interior to its historic splendor. Cement-based stucco added in the 1980s had trapped water inside the church and damaged its interior decorations. It is being removed and replaced with traditional mud plaster incorporating pulp from the prickly pear cactus. This material "breathes" better and allows excess water to escape, but it requires more frequent inspection and has higher maintenance costs. Following extensive and ongoing restoration of decorations, the mission church interior appears much in its original state, with brilliant colors and complex designs.

Architecture

San Xavier has an elegant white stucco, Moorish-inspired exterior, with an ornately decorated entrance. Visitors entering the massive, carved mesquite-wood doors are often struck both by the coolness of the interior and the dazzling colors of the paintings, carvings, frescoes, and statues. Its rich ornamentation displays a mixture of New Spain and Native American artistic motifs.

The floor plan of the church resembles the classic Latin cross, with a main aisle separated from the sanctuary by the transept, which has chapels at either end. At least three different artists painted the artwork inside the church. It is considered by many to be the finest example of Spanish mission architecture in the United States.

Mission today

Unlike the other Spanish missions in Arizona, San Xavier is still actively run by Franciscans, and continues to serve the native community by which it was built. Widely considered to be the finest example of Spanish Colonial architecture in the United States, the Mission hosts some 200,000 visitors each year. It is open to the public daily, except when being used for church services. The Franciscan Sisters of Christian Charity, who have taught at the school since 1872, continue with their work and reside in the mission convent. It has a mausoleum which is open for visiting.
The mission makes a cameo appearance in Willa Cather's 1927 novel Death Comes for the Archbishop when it is described by Vaillant as "the most beautiful church on the continent, though it had been neglected for more than two hundred years."

Mission San Xavier del Bac was declared a National Historic Landmark in 1960 and was listed on the National Register of Historic Places in 1966. The San Xavier Festival is held the evening of the Friday after Easter and features a torch-light parade of Tohono O'odham and Yaqui tribal members.

Nearby communities

Martinez Hill

To the east of the San Xavier Mission, abutting the I-19 Freeway, is Martinez Hill. This hill, according to historian David Leighton, is named in honor of Jose Maria Martinez. Mr. Martinez was born in the Pimería Alta (present-day northern Sonora and southern Arizona), in the early 1800s. Around 1833, Jose wed Felipa Yrigoyen, likely in Tubac, Sonora. The couple had many children, including Maria and Nicolas Martinez. From 1836 to 1838, Lt. Col. Jose Maria Martinez was in charge of the presidio in Tucson. In 1838, he retired from the military and was given land in Tubac. Ten years later, an attack by Apache Indians forced the residents to abandon the town, with most moving to Tucson, but the Martinez family relocated to San Xavier, where he was granted land by the chief. The hill that bears his name was either included in the land grant or was very close to it. Martinez went into the cattle business for many years and died from wounds suffered in an Apache attack in 1868.

Los Reales

To the north of San Xavier Mission existed the Los Reales community. The community (sometimes referred to as a town or village) is believed to have existed from about the early 1860s to about 1912, but had long been forgotten until an article in the Arizona Daily Star by historian David Leighton brought it to light. The community was started when a miner named S.R. Domingo built a home and foundry just north of the San Xavier Mission, on the west bank of the Santa Cruz River. He prospered in his mining endeavor and is believed to have kept his wealth buried in the tall grasses along the river, since no banks existed at the time. In time, other individuals came to the area and began farms in the fertile valley supported by the ever-flowing river, and the community grew. They built adobe homes, planted crops, and established the first Los Reales community. Domingo is believed to have been murdered in the late 1860s by miners he had hired to work his mine, but it is unknown what happened to his riches.

In 1874, President Ulysses S. Grant established the San Xavier Indian Reservation and all non-Native Americans were forced to leave the Indian lands. These individuals set up the new or second Los Reales on the east bank of the river. This new community across from the old Los Reales included two stores and a blacksmith shop nearby. The Los Reales Cemetery also existed on that side of the river. It is believed that in 1912, as a result of the Midvale Farms (now the Midvale Park neighborhood) taking much of the water from the river, the farming village ceased to exist. The only known remnants of the old town are parts of the cemetery and a street known as Los Reales Road.

In popular media
The exterior of the Mission was used in the 1979 TV mini-series Salem's Lot, as an establishing shot shot for a fictitious church in Guatemala.

See also

 Spanish missions in Arizona
 Spanish Missions in the Sonoran Desert
 Architecture of the California missions
 List of Jesuit sites
 List of the oldest churches in the United States
 List of the oldest buildings in Arizona

References

 Nentvig, J. 1980. Rudo Ensayo: A Description of Sonora and Arizona in 1764. University of Arizona Press, Tucson, AZ.

External links

 Official Mission San Xavier del Bac website
 The Mission Garden, located adjacent to San Xavier mission, in one of the longest known areas of continuous cultivation in the United States.
 Mission of San Xavier del Bac article at the Catholic Encyclopedia
 Online book on Mission San Xavier del Bac
 
 American Southwest, a National Park Service Discover Our Shared Heritage Travel Itinerary

Churches in Pima County, Arizona
Catholic Church in Arizona
Buildings and structures in Pima County, Arizona
History of Pima County, Arizona
Jesuit history in North America
Tohono O'odham Nation
1699 establishments in New Spain
Mausoleums on the National Register of Historic Places
National Historic Landmarks in Arizona
National Register of Historic Places in Tucson, Arizona
Churches on the National Register of Historic Places in Arizona
Catholic pilgrimage sites
Stagecoach stops in the United States
San Antonio–San Diego Mail Line
Protected areas established in 1960
Historic American Buildings Survey in Arizona
Landmarks in Tucson, Arizona
Tourist attractions in Pima County, Arizona
Spanish Colonial architecture in Arizona
1692 establishments in New Spain